E331 may refer to:
 European route E331, which is a part of Bundesautobahn 44
 E331 series, a former electric multiple unit (EMU) used for commuter services
 E331, the E number of the salt forms of sodium citrate